Amanda Newton may refer to:

 Amanda Newton (illustrator)
 Amanda Newton (netball)